Half a Dozen Babies (also known as Life's Little Struggles) is a 1999 ABC television film. It stars Scott and Melissa Reeves.

Plot
A young couple have been struggling to have a baby for years, unsuccessfully. Then, suddenly, one day, they find out that they are having sextuplets. The movie is based on the true story of Keith and Becki Dilley and the Dilley sextuplets, born in 1993.

Cast 
Scott Reeves as Keith Dilley
Melissa Reeves as Becki Dilley
Judith Ivey as Doris Stauffer
Teri Garr as Lee Dilley
Kate McNeill as Becki's Doctor

External links 

hollywood.com entry Retrieved on January 9, 2010

1999 television films
1999 films
1999 drama films
American films based on actual events
American television films
Films set in Indianapolis